Red Lane Tavern is a historic inn and tavern located at Powhatan, Powhatan County, Virginia. It was built in 1832, and is a 1 1/2-story, log building set on a brick foundation.  The main block has a gable roof and exterior end chimneys.  It has a 1 1/2-story kitchen connect to the main block by a one-story addition.  The building housed an ordinary from 1836 to 1845.  It is representative of a Tidewater South folk house.

It was added to the National Register of Historic Places in 2002.

References

Drinking establishments on the National Register of Historic Places in Virginia
Houses completed in 1832
Houses in Powhatan County, Virginia
National Register of Historic Places in Powhatan County, Virginia